Yelizaveta Tishchenko (born 7 February 1975 in Kiev, last name also spelled Tichtchenko) is a retired female volleyball player from Russia, who made her debut for the Soviet national team in 1991. She competed in three consecutive Olympic Games (1996, 2000 and 2004), and twice won a silver medal.

She represented her country more than 470 times from 1991 through 2004, playing as Middle Blocker in the starting 6 of the National Team and leading the Sbornaya as its Captain in 2003 & 2004.
Liza won the European Championships (4 times), the World Grand Prix (3 times), and several medals at World Championships and World Grand Champions Cups. She was among the best attackers in each tournament entered, winning best spiker (attacker) awards at most international tournaments between 1999 and 2003, including the prestigious title of the world's ‘Best Spiker of the Year’ (FIVB 2002).

With her club teams (namely Uralochka VC of Ekaterinburg) she won the Russian Championship 13 times and the European Champions League three times.

Her greatest achievement, however, was coming back to play for Russia at the Olympic Games in Athens after having had open surgery on her knees only 3 months before. Impossible her doctors said after she won the silver medal in a dramatic final against China.

She retired from the National Team and professional volleyball in 2004, however she continued to play for teams in the German and Swiss premier leagues. Liza has worked for the commercial department of UEFA and currently is at the FIVB TV & Marketing Department.

Honours
 1991 World Under-20 Championship — 1st place
 1992 European Junior Championship — 1st place
 1993 FIVB World Grand Prix — 3rd place
 1993 European Championship — 1st place
 1993 World Grand Champions Cup — 3rd place
 1994 Goodwill Games — 1st place
 1994 World Championship — 3rd place
 1995 European Championship — 3rd place
 1996 FIVB World Grand Prix — 3rd place
 1996 Olympic Games — 4th place
 1997 FIVB World Grand Prix — 1st place
 1997 European Championship — 1st place
 1997 World Grand Champions Cup — 1st place
 1998 FIVB World Grand Prix — 2nd place
 1998 World Championship — 3rd place
 1999 FIVB World Grand Prix — 1st place
 1999 European Championship — 1st place
 1999 World Cup — 2nd place
 2000 FIVB World Grand Prix — 2nd place
 2000 Olympic Games — 2nd place
 2001 FIVB World Grand Prix — 3rd place
 2001 European Championship — 1st place
 2001 World Grand Champions Cup — 2nd place
 2002 FIVB World Grand Prix — 1st place
 2002 World Championship — 3rd place
 2003 FIVB World Grand Prix — 2nd place
 2004 Olympic Games — 2nd place

Individual awards
 1997 FIVB World Grand Prix "Best Spiker"
 1999 FIVB World Grand Prix "Best Spiker"
 1999 European Championship "Best Blocker"
 1999 European Championship "Best Spiker"
 2001 FIVB World Grand Prix "Best Spiker"
 2001 European Championship "Best Spiker"
 2001 World Grand Champions Cup "Best Spiker"
 2002 FIVB World Grand Prix "Best Spiker"
 2002 World Championship "Best Spiker"
 2003 FIVB World Grand Prix "Best Spiker"
 2003 European Championship "Best Spiker"

References
 Profile

1975 births
Living people
Volleyball players at the 1996 Summer Olympics
Volleyball players at the 2000 Summer Olympics
Volleyball players at the 2004 Summer Olympics
Olympic volleyball players of Russia
Olympic silver medalists for Russia
Sportspeople from Kyiv
Russian women's volleyball players
Olympic medalists in volleyball
Medalists at the 2004 Summer Olympics
Medalists at the 2000 Summer Olympics
Competitors at the 1994 Goodwill Games
Goodwill Games medalists in volleyball